Robert Shaw (1870–unknown) was a Scottish footballer who played in the Football League for Darwen.

References

1870 births
Date of death unknown
Scottish footballers
English Football League players
Association football forwards
Abercorn F.C. players
Stockton F.C. players
Darwen F.C. players